Oltushevo is a rural locality (a village) in Gorod Vyazniki, Vyaznikovsky District, Vladimir Oblast, Russia. The population was 65 as of 2010. There is 1 street.

Geography 
Oltushevo is located on the right bank of the Klyazma River, 17 km east of Vyazniki (the district's administrative centre) by road. Zavrazhye is the nearest rural locality.

References 

Rural localities in Vyaznikovsky District
Vyaznikovsky Uyezd